Angraecum cucullatum is a species of orchid found in Réunion.

References 

cucullatum
Orchids of Réunion
Endemic flora of Réunion